Kolhar may refer to:

Places in India
 Kolhar, Bijapur, a panchayat village, Kolhar taluka 
 Kolhar (Old), a village in Kolhar taluka
 Kolhar River, the Kolar River in Nagpur district, Maharashtra

Fictional
 Kolhar (Dune), a planet in Frank Herbert's fictional Dune universe

See also
 Kolar (disambiguation)
 Kohler (disambiguation)
 Kohlar, a Klingon character in the Star Trek: Voyager episode "Prophecy"